The Abbey of Santa Maria della Vittoria (Italian: L’abbazia di Santa Maria della Vittoria) was a Cistercian monastery located in Scurcola Marsicana, Province of L'Aquila, Italy.

History

The abbey was built by Charles I of Naples to celebrate the victory in the Battle of Tagliacozzo against Conradin, to control the Kingdom of Sicily.

The construction started in 1274, and in 1277 the abbey hosted the first monks. Mother abbey of Santa Maria della Vittoria was the Louroux Abbey in Vernantes (Anjou), places of origin of large part of the soldiers involved in the battle.

The church was consecrated on May 12, 1278 and it was definitively completed in 1282.

Architecture
Nowadays the abbey is completely destroyed. Two portals of the original church can be found in different churches of Scurcola Marsicana: the new church of Santa Maria della Vittoria, close to the Rocca Orsini, and the Sant’Antonio church, along the Via Tiburtina.

See also
 List of Cistercian monasteries

References

Bibliography

External links

Maria della Vittoria
Scurcola Marsicana